Xu Qing (born October 1960) is a Chinese engineer currently serving as a chief technologist at China State Shipbuilding Corporation.

Biography
Xu was born in Wuhan, Hubei, in October 1960. After graduating from Shanghai Jiao Tong University in 1982, he was assigned to the 701 Institute of China State Shipbuilding Corporation.

Honours and awards
 2015 State Science and Technology Progress Award (First Class) 
 2015 Science and Technology Progress Award of the Ho Leung Ho Lee Foundation 
 November 22, 2019 Member of the Chinese Academy of Engineering (CAE)

References

1960 births
Living people
People from Wuhan
Engineers from Hubei
Shanghai Jiao Tong University alumni
Members of the Chinese Academy of Engineering
Chinese naval architects